Abyla trigona is a colonial siphonophore in the family Abylidae. It was described in 1925.

Description
The species has an anterior nectophore that is the same size both broad and wide.  It also has very heavy irregular and serrate ridges. The ventral facet is not separated from the apico-ventral facet.  The posterior nectophore can have from 4 to 11 teeth on a comb. It also has two rows of very serrated teeth on the basal margin.

Distribution
The species is found mainly in tropical waters. Individuals were spotted in the South China Sea in the upper 200 m during February and March. There are two records from the South Pacific and several in the wetsren and central tropical Pacific.

References

Plankton
Species described in 1827
Abylidae
Bioluminescent cnidarians